Garey may refer to:

First name
 Garey Bies, a Republican Party member of the Wisconsin State Assembly
 Garey Bridges, a British actor
 Garey Forster, US radio host and politician
 Garey Ingram, baseball player
 Garey Mathurin, West Indian cricketer

Surname
 Alva Garey, Wisconsin, USA, soldier, politician
 Enoch Barton Garey, Maryland, USA, soldier, policeman, and writer
 Jason Garey, an American soccer player
 Michael Garey, a computer science researcher and author

Places
 Garey, California, a small town in the United States
 The Garey, a small rural request stop on the northern section of the Manx Electric Railway on the Isle of Man